The 1958 United States Senate election in Maryland was held on November 4, 1958. 

Senator James Glenn Beall narrowly defeated Baltimore Mayor Thomas D'Alesandro for re-election to a second term. Beall's victory came despite a national landslide for Senate Democrats.

Republican primary

Candidates
 James Glenn Beall, incumbent senator
 Henry J. Lague, candidate for Senate in 1956

Results

Democratic primary

Candidates
 James Cabell Bruce, former United States Ambassador to Argentina
 Thomas D'Alesandro Jr., Mayor of Baltimore
 Andrew J. Easter
 William F. Fadler Jr.
 Clarence Long, Johns Hopkins University professor and Eisenhower adviser
 George P. Mahoney, paving contractor and nominee for Senate in 1952
 Alden A. Potter

Results

General election

Results

Results by county

Counties that flipped from Democrat to Republican
Baltimore (City)
Cecil

Counties that flipped from Republican to Democrat
Calvert
Dorchester
Prince George's
Worcester

See also
1958 United States Senate elections
1958 United States elections

References

Notes

1958
Maryland
United States Senate